Bolshaya Sidorova is a rural locality (a village) in Beloyevskoye Rural Settlement, Kudymkarsky District, Perm Krai, Russia. The population was 109 as of 2010. There are 6 streets.

Geography 
Bolshaya Sidorova is located 43 km northwest of Kudymkar (the district's administrative centre) by road. Malaya Sidorova is the nearest rural locality.

References 

Rural localities in Kudymkarsky District